{{DISPLAYTITLE:C9H13NO2}}
The molecular formula C9H13NO2 (molar mass:  167.20 g/mol, exact mass: 167.094629) may refer to:

 Azaspirodecanedione
 Deoxyepinephrine
 Ecgonidine
 Ethinamate
 meta-Hydroxynorephedrine
 para-Hydroxynorephedrine
 Metaraminol
 alpha-Methyldopamine
 3-Methoxytyramine
 Oxime V
 Phenylephrine
 Pyrithyldione
 Synephrine
 Tyrosinol